is a Japanese professional footballer who plays as a centre back for J1 League club Cerezo Osaka.

Career
Toriumi was born in Kisarazu and played youth football with JEF United Chiba and Meiji University before starting his professional career with JEF United Chiba senior squad in 2018. After three seasons and 80 appearances in the J2 League, Toriumi moved to Cerezo Osaka at the end of 2020.

Club statistics

References

External links

Profile at J. League
Profile at Cerezo Osaka

1995 births
Living people
Association football people from Chiba Prefecture
Japanese footballers
J2 League players
J1 League players
JEF United Chiba players
Cerezo Osaka players
Association football defenders